Su'a Hellene Wallwork-Lamb is a Samoan lawyer and jurist. Since September 2021 she has been Attorney-General of Samoa.

Su'a is from Lefaga and was educated at the University of Auckland. After working in the Office of the Attorney-General, she returned to New Zealand, where she worked for the New Zealand Police and the Commerce Commission and in private practice. In 2013 she returned to Samoa and established a law firm with her husband. In April 2016 she was appointed Sweden's Honorary Consul in Samoa.

In March 2017 she was elected President of the Samoa Law Society. She served as vice-president for the next three years, and was elected president again in 2021. As Vice-president of the society she fronted the society's submissions during the 2021 Samoan constitutional crisis, criticising O le Ao o le Malo Tuimalealiʻifano Vaʻaletoʻa Sualauvi II's attempt to stop parliament from meeting and the Human Rights Protection Party's post-crisis attacks on the judiciary.

She was appointed interim Attorney-General of Samoa on 4 September 2021, following the dismissal of Savalenoa Mareva Betham Annandale for failing to defend the judiciary. She was sworn in on 8 September 2021. Cabinet appointed Su'a to a full term three-year term on 22 December 2022.

She was awarded the title of Su'a by her village in 2008. In December 2022 she was named one of the Samoa Observer's people of the year.

Notes

References

Living people
Year of birth missing (living people)
People from A'ana
Samoan lawyers
Attorneys General of Samoa
University of Auckland alumni
21st-century women lawyers